Meprotixol is a cough suppressant. It has also been used for the treatment of rheumatic diseases.

References 

Antitussives
Thioxanthenes
Phenol ethers
Tertiary alcohols
Dimethylamino compounds